The San Vito S1 is a Brazilian sport car made by San Vito, a brand from "Personal Parts". The car uses ethanol as fuel.

Design and development 
Vito Simone studied architecture in 1974 and he was already focused on cars, so he made some models to scale. Later he worked for Ford Motor Company in design areas for 20 years. When he retired from Ford in 1996, he founded the company "Personal Parts"  which is currently the largest manufacturer of aerodynamic fiberglass kits in Brazil . Not satisfied with it, in 2005 he started working on the ISOR project, in order to create a 100% Brazilian made sports car, this project was presented in 2008 as San Vito S1.

It is a small car, 3.74 m long, 1.70 m wide and 1.15 m high. It has a tubular chassis with round longitudinal sections and rectangular cross sections, weighs  and is powered by a Volkswagen / Audi origin engine mounted in the rear and modified to run only with ethanol that produces .

Specifications 
According to the manufacturer

References

Bibliography

External links 
pictures of the car

Cars of Brazil